A gantry (also known as a sign holder, road sign holder, sign structure or road sign structure) is a traffic sign assembly in which signs are mounted or railway signals are supported on an overhead support. They also often contain the apparatus for  traffic monitoring systems and cameras, or open road tolling systems.

Gantries are usually built on high-traffic roads or routes with several lanes, where signs posted on the side of the highway would be hard for drivers to see.  Gantries may be cantilevered or one-sided on the left, right and center (sometimes referred to as a half-gantry or Butterfly gantry), or they may be bridges with poles on each side.  Similar gantries are used in railway signalling or to suspend overhead lines on multi-track lines.

Around the world

Canada
Gantry signs are commonly used in urban highways in Canada to support overhead signs. Half-gantries are used to place signs near exits where space does not permit having signs to the right side of the roadway. Gantries can also be used to hold cameras for toll road entrances/exits and to hold electronic information signs, such as on Ontario Highway 407. The style of gantry used are mostly truss gantries. Older gantries have truss supports (round or box) and newer ones are now supported by cylindrical legs. In most jurisdictions in Canada, signs that are mounted on overhead gantries are installed perpendicular to the roadway. In Québec, however, signs are angled slightly face-down towards the roadway such that the sign face is directed towards the motorists below. In New Brunswick, the opposite is true: signs are angled slightly face-up to capture and reflect more sunlight towards the roadway.

Hong Kong
Hong Kong's highways use a gantry crane type to support signs. The road signs are usually located on top and some have lights to indicate open or closed lanes.

United Kingdom
Gantry signs are being installed at various locations around the trunk motorway network as increasing amounts of traffic mean that road signs at the side of the carriageway are frequently obscured by large goods vehicles. They may also consist of variable-message signs, and more recently Active Traffic Management, to close lanes due to accidents and for other reasons. They can also be used to specify temporary speed limits. Gantries in the United Kingdom display exit (junction) numbers, distances to junctions / exits (1 mile, 1/2 mile, 1/4 mile, 1/3 mile, 3/4 mile, 2/3 mile) and destinations reached, and if necessary what lane to use for them.

United States

Gantry signs are used frequently in the U.S., particularly in urban areas where freeways have an exit every mile to fit in with the grid system. These half-gantries usually have the exit number and the road or street that can be reached. Gantries can also span the whole road, such as at major junctions.

Designs
W, M and N's 
Pedestal - for free and toll roads
Tubular pipes

Gallery of road gantries

Railway use 
On railways, gantries span multiple railway tracks and carry either railway signals, overhead lines or both.

Gallery of railway gantries

See also

 Anchor portal
At-grade intersection
Controlled-access highway
Interchange
Limited-access road
 Railroad signal bridge
Toll road
 Traction current pylon
Traffic sign
 Utility pole
Variable-message sign

External links

Traffic signs
Street furniture